University of Tartu Sports Hall is a multi-purpose indoor arena complex in Tartu. It was opened in 1982 and is owned by the University of Tartu Academic Sports Club.

It's located on the left bank of the Emajõgi, in Ülejõe neighbourhood.

References

External links
 

Sport in Tartu
Sports venues in Estonia
Basketball venues in Estonia
Indoor arenas in Estonia
Buildings and structures in Tartu
Athletics (track and field) venues in Estonia
Volleyball venues in Estonia